Style at Home is a monthly Canadian home decor and lifestyle magazine, which publishes articles about interior design, home decorating projects, outdoor living and entertaining.

History and profile
Style at Home was established in 1997 by Telemedia. Gail Johnston Habs was the founding editor. The magazine was acquired by Transcontinental Media in 2000, and then TVA Group in 2014. The current editor-in-chief is Véronique Leblanc. The magazine's web site was launched in September 2003.

References

External links

Lifestyle magazines published in Canada
Monthly magazines published in Canada
Women's magazines published in Canada
Magazines established in 1997
Magazines published in Toronto